Ajai Daniels (born 1 July 1998) is a Bermudian international footballer who plays for Devonshire Cougars, as a goalkeeper.

Club career
Daniels began his career with Dandy Town Hornets. In March 2018, Daniels saved a penalty for Southampton Rangers in a Bermuda FA Cup semi-final penalty shoot-out against Paget Lions. In the summer of 2019, Daniels joined Devonshire Cougars.

International career
In 2014, Daniels represented Bermuda under-17's in the Mexico Cup of Nations tournament, before picking up an injury against their Chilean counterparts.

On 22 January 2017, Daniels made his international debut for Bermuda in a 4–2 loss against Canada.

References

1998 births
Living people
Bermudian footballers
Association football goalkeepers
Dandy Town Hornets F.C. players
Devonshire Cougars players
Bermuda international footballers
Bermuda youth international footballers